Stokes law can refer to:
Stokes' law, for friction force
Stokes' law (sound attenuation), describing attenuation of sound in Newtonian liquids

See also
 Stokes' theorem, in integration